Lugovoy is an urban locality (an urban-type settlement) in Kondinsky District of Khanty–Mansi Autonomous Okrug, Russia. Population:

References

Urban-type settlements in Khanty-Mansi Autonomous Okrug